Ulysses is a 2011 Chilean drama film directed by Oscar Godoy.

Plot
The movie chronicles the life of Julio (Jorge Román), a Peruvian immigrant in Chile who works as a university history professor. He lives in deep loneliness, without decent housing or relationships with others, but persists with tenacity in his mission to work and send money to his mother in Peru. The film depicts his daily struggle to fit into a foreign country that rejects him, as he longs for home like a modern-day Ulysses condemned to eternal wandering.

Cast
Jorge Román as Julio
Francisca Gavilán as Flavia

References

External links

2011 films
2011 drama films
2010s Spanish-language films
Chilean drama films
2010s Chilean films